Auratonota is a genus of moths belonging to the family Tortricidae.

Species
Auratonota aenigmatica Meyrick, 1912
Auratonota angustovalva Razowski & Pelz, 2007
Auratonota aporema Dognin, 1912
Auratonota argentana Razowski & Pelz, 2007
Auratonota aurantica Busck, 1920
Auratonota auriferana Razowski & Pelz, 2007
Auratonota auriginea Razowski & Becker, 2000
Auratonota aurochra Razowski & Wojtusiak, 2006
Auratonota bacata Razowski & Pelz, 2007
Auratonota badiaurea Razowski & Becker, 2000
Auratonota brachuncus Razowski & Pelz, 2007
Auratonota caeruleata Razowski & Pelz, 2007
Auratonota caliginosa Razowski & Pelz, 2007
Auratonota cataponera Razowski & Becker, 2000
Auratonota chemillena Razowski & Wojtusiak, 2010
Auratonota chlamydophora Razowski & Wojtusiak, 2006
Auratonota clasmata Razowski & Becker, 2000
Auratonota croceana Razowski & Pelz, 2007
Auratonota cubana Razowski & Becker, 2000
Auratonota dispersa Brown, 1990
Auratonota dominica Brown, 1993
Auratonota effera Razowski & Becker, 2000
Auratonota exoptata Razowski & Becker, 2000
Auratonota fasciata Razowski & Pelz, 2007
Auratonota flora Razowski & Becker, 2000
Auratonota foederata Razowski & Becker, 2000
Auratonota hyacinthina Meyrick, 1912
Auratonota hydrogramma Meyrick, 1912
Auratonota magnifica Razowski & Becker, 2000
Auratonota maldonada Razowski & Becker, 2000
Auratonota meion Razowski & Wojtusiak, 2011
Auratonota mimstigmosa Razowski & Wojtusiak, 2011
Auratonota monochroma Razowski & Becker, 2000
Auratonota moronana Razowski & Becker, 2000
Auratonota multifurcata Meyrick, 1932
Auratonota napoana Razowski & Pelz, 2007
Auratonota nugax Razowski & Becker, 2000
Auratonota omorpha Razowski & Becker, 2000
Auratonota ovulus Razowski & Wojtusiak, 2008
Auratonota oxytenia Razowski & Becker, 2000
Auratonota paidosocia Razowski & Becker, 2000
Auratonota paramaldonada Razowski & Wojtusiak, 2008
Auratonota petalocrossa Meyrick, 1926
Auratonota pharata Brown, 2006
Auratonota pichincha Razowski & Pelz, 2007
Auratonota polymaculata Razowski & Wojtusiak, 2008
Auratonota rubromixta Razowski & Wojtusiak, 2008
Auratonota rutra Razowski & Pelz, 2007
Auratonota serotina Razowski & Becker, 2000
Auratonota siskae Razowski & Pelz, 2007
Auratonota spinivalva Razowksi & Becker, 2000
Auratonota splendida Razowski & Becker, 2000
Auratonota stigmosa Razowski & Becker, 2000
Auratonota sucumbiosa Razowski & Wojtusiak, 2009
Auratonota tessellata Razowski & Becker, 2000
Auratonota virgata Razowski & Becker, 2000
Auratonota yukipana Razowski & Pelz, 2007

References

 , 1990: New species and first U.S. record of Auratonota (Lepidoptera: Tortricidae). Florida Entomologist 73 (1): 153-157 (154). Full article: .
 , 2005: World Catalogue of Insects volume 5 Tortricidae.
 , 2006: A new species of Auratonota (Lepidoptera: Totricidae: Chlidanotinae) formerly confused with A. hydrogramma (Meyrick). Journal of the Lepidopterists' Society 60 (3): 143-148. Full article: .
 , 1987, Bulletin De l'Academie Polonaise Des Sciences. Serie Des Sciences Biologiques 35: 62.
 , 2000 (1999): A review of the New World Chlidanotini (Lepidoptera, Tortricidae). Revista brasileira de Zoologia 16 (4): 1149-1182 (1163). Full article: .
 , 2007, Auratonota Razowski, 1987 from Ecuador with description of 14 new species (Lepidoptera: Tortricidae), Entomologische Zeitschrift 117 (2): 51-59.
 , 2006: Tortricidae (Lepidoptera) in the valley of Río Gualaceo, East Cordillera in Ecuador, with descriptions of new taxa. Acta Zoologica Cracoviensia 49B (1-2): 17-53. Full article:  .
 , 2008: Tortricidae (Lepidoptera) from the mountains of Ecuador. Part 1: Southern Highlands. Acta Zoologica Cracoviensia 51B (1-2): 7-41 Full article:  .
 , 2008: Tortricidae from the Mountains of Ecuador. Part III: Western Cordillera (Insecta: Lepidoptera). Genus 19 (3): 497-575. Full article: 
 , 2009: Tortricidae (Lepidoptera) from the mountains of Ecuador and remarks on their geographical distribution. Part IV. Eastern Cordillera. Acta Zoologica Cracoviensia 51B (1-2): 119-187. . Full article: .
 , 2010: Tortricidae (Lepidoptera) from Peru. Acta Zoologica Cracoviensia 53B (1-2): 73-159. . Full article:  .
 , 2011: Tortricidae (Lepidoptera) from Colombia. Acta Zoologica Cracoviensia 54B (1-2): 103-128. Full article:  .

External links
Tortricidae.com

 
Chlidanotini
Tortricidae genera
Taxa named by Józef Razowski